Albert Ernest "A. E." Backus (January 3, 1906 – June 6, 1990), also known as Beanie  Backus, was an American artist famous for his vivid Florida landscapes.

Art career

Early influences

Beanie was mostly self-taught, although he did enjoy two summer stints at the Parsons School of Design in New York City in 1924–25. At Parsons he learned the academic principles of symmetry and design that he had previously explored instinctually. Backus always earned his living through his artistic talent, first as a commercial artist painting signs, billboards and theater marquees, and later encouraged by Dorothy Binney Palmer, his first true patron, to pursue his landscape paintings as a full-time occupation. He painted vivid Florida landscapes, 1950's kitsch images of the ubiquitous hibiscus and other tropical flowers, the beautiful Florida sunset, beach and river scenes and the spectacular vistas of the Everglades.

World War II paintings

Much like a visual journal of his travels, Backus recorded his journeys through his artwork. During WWII, while in the Navy aboard the USS Hermitage, he painted in both watercolor and oils scenes of the South Pacific, the California coast and of the European ports he visited. Later in his life, he created a series of scenes of the Caribbean focusing on the Bahamas, Haiti and—most prolifically—of his second home in Jamaica. Backus spent his entire life studying his subjects; it is because of this passion for wildlife and plants combined with his natural talents that he was able to produce such accurate and captivating paintings.

Impressionistic works

Many of Backus' earlier paintings dating from the 1930s to the late 1960s are categorized as being more impressionistic than most of his later works and were often done with a palette knife. Paint was applied to the canvas or board with impetuous and generous strokes. The palette knife was used deftly and with great boldness. The juxtaposition of color next to color created a new and different reality for the viewer. Other than the early 20th century vacationing artists such as Winslow Homer or the Hudson River School icon Herman Herzog, Backus was the first artist to truly see the subtle beauty of Florida and to attempt to capture it on canvas. Backus was the seminal Florida landscape painter. All those who followed were in some way trying to emulate his work.

Later works

As Backus's career progressed, his style evolved into a more refined style that relied more heavily on the brush rather than the palette knife. He spent more time on his later, more romanticized paintings—adding more details and increasingly painting commission pieces for patrons eager to own a Backus-original for themselves.

The Florida Highwaymen

Backus is also credited with teaching art to a wide range of students. No one knows how many artists actually studied with Backus or were merely mentored or inspired by him. Estimates put the number in the hundreds. Backus's protegees are referred to as "the Indian River School" of artists. A great deal of misinformation circulates as to Backus's role in the creation of the outsider art, a phenomenon referred to as the Highwaymen. To be sure, Alfred Hair, one of the driving forces behind the loosely allied group of African-American artists and the inspiration to create hastily rendered images of a fantasized Florida was definitely a student of Backus (though briefly). The remaining members of the approximately 26 African-American landscape painters painting in and around Fort Pierce, Florida, were certainly inspired by Backus success but they were not actual students of Backus. The Highwaymen directly copied Backus' paintings with varying degrees of success, Harold Newton being the one whose artistic talents bring him closest to Backus.

Personal life

Hobbies

Backus was known for always having music playing in his home. He often had his record player playing, and some times even had Jazz musicians jamming. He was known to keep company with Zora Neale Hurston. The two were known to be very good friends and both had a fervent passion for the youth of the Fort Pierce area. "Beanie", which he was also affectionately called by some, also kept company with aspiring young artists including Alfred Hair. Backus was known to spend time with people of all walks of life and all races. His Doors were always open to help someone in need. He let young artists stay at his studio gallery home for a few weeks if they needed to. There was one young Haitian artist that he meet through a friend that stayed for a few months. He would often invite visitors to stay for a meal. He liked to keep a lively conversation and often quoted fellow artist Waldo E. Sexton "I'd rather be a liar than a bore". Upon his death in 1990, Backus left a half-finished oil painting now displayed in the Backus Gallery.

Family

Backus, who was, during his young adulthood, a confirmed bachelor married a woman twenty years his junior in 1951. His wife, Patsy (1926–1955) died at the age of 29 after having open heart surgery. They never had any children together, but "Beanie" had many other "children". There were at least 20 kids over the years that he would mentor and help put through college that spent time at his home after school and on weekends that were known as "Backus Brats". Outside of the "Brats", There were still a few hundred more children over his years as an artist and philanthropist that he would have a strong influence upon during his lifetime.

Backus Gallery 
Much of Backus 's work is now on display at the A. E. Backus Gallery & Museum in Fort Pierce, Florida, as well as internet art galleries and bricks and mortar galleries located mainly in Florida.

References

  N. Kuzmanovic, Tropical Light: The Art of A.E. Backus, New York, 2016.

External links

 Florida Highwaymen art purchasing link

1906 births
1990 deaths
People from Fort Pierce, Florida
Painters from Florida
20th-century American painters
American male painters
20th-century American male artists